Viane may refer to:

Denis Viane (born 1977), Belgian footballer
Gray Viane (born 1982), New Zealand rugby league player
Viane, Belgium, a village in Belgium
Viane, Tarn, French commune